The Rock Band series of music video games supports downloadable songs for the Xbox 360, PlayStation 3, and Wii versions through the consoles' respective online services. Users can download songs on a track-by-track basis, with many of the tracks also offered as part of a "song pack" or complete album at a discounted rate. These packs are available for the Wii only on Rock Band 3. Most downloadable songs are playable within every game mode, including the Band World Tour career mode. All downloadable songs released before October 26, 2010 are cross-compatible between Rock Band, Rock Band 2 and Rock Band 3, while those after only work with Rock Band 3.  Certain songs deemed "suitable for all ages" by Harmonix are also available for use in Lego Rock Band.

The Wii version of Rock Band does not support downloadable content, but Rock Band 2 and Rock Band 3 do, with DLC first made available in January 2009. Songs from the back catalogue of downloadable content were released for the Wii weekly in an effort by Harmonix to provide Wii players with every previously available song.

Following the release of Rock Band 4 for the PlayStation 4 and Xbox One, all previously purchased downloadable content for Rock Band 3 and earlier is forward compatible (with the exception of any downloadable content purchased for The Beatles: Rock Band) within the same system family at no additional cost.

List of songs released in 2011 

The following table lists the available songs for the Rock Band series released in 2011. All songs available in packs are also available as individual song downloads on the same date, unless otherwise noted. New songs are released on Tuesdays for Xbox Live, PlayStation Network, and Nintendo WFC, unless otherwise noted. Dates listed are the initial release of songs on Xbox Live. Starting May 20, 2008, all downloadable songs are available in both the North American and European markets, unless otherwise noted.

As of October 2009, over 800 songs have been made available as downloadable content (DLC). As of October 19, 2009, over 60 million downloadable song purchases have been made by players. The following is a list of the songs that have been released in 2011.

Some songs released before Rock Band 3 have been retrofitted to include Rock Band 3 features, including backing vocals, and the ability to buy an additional pack for Pro Guitar/Bass charts without having to buy the "RB3 Version" of the song.  Certain songs have been marked "family friendly" by Harmonix; such songs released before Rock Band 3s launch on October 26, 2010 can be played in Lego Rock Band.

Since October 26, 2010 (with The Doors Pack 01), all new songs are only playable in Rock Band 3, due to a change in the file format. All songs released via downloadable content are playable in Rock Band 3, and support its new Pro Drum mode.  Most songs released for Rock Band 3 include core features for keyboards, Pro Keyboards, and backing vocals in the core song, where they are appropriate. Additionally, some of these songs features charts for Pro Guitar and Bass that can also be purchased.
{| class="wikitable sortable" border="1" style="font-size:90%; text-align:center; margin:5px;"
|-
!style="background:#dde;"|Song title
!style="background:#dde;"|Artist
!style="background:#dde;"|Year
!style="background:#dde;"|Genre
!style="background:#dde;"|Single / Pack name
!style="background:#dde;"|Release date
!style="background:#dde;"|Family Friendly
!style="background:#dde;"|Additional Rock Band 3 Features
|-
<onlyinclude>
|"Cry, Cry, Cry"
|Johnny Cash
|1955
|Country
|Johnny Cash 01
|Jan 4, 2011
|
|
|-
|"Don't Take Your Guns to Town"
|Johnny Cash
|1958
|Country
|Johnny Cash 01
|Jan 4, 2011
|
|
|-
|"Five Feet High and Rising"
|Johnny Cash
|1959
|Country
|Johnny Cash 01
|Jan 4, 2011
|
|
|-
|"Folsom Prison Blues"
|Johnny Cash
|1955
|Country
|Johnny Cash 01
|Jan 4, 2011
|
|
|-
|"I Got Stripes"
|Johnny Cash
|1959
|Country
|Johnny Cash 01
|Jan 4, 2011
|
|
|-
|"I Walk the Line"
|Johnny Cash
|1956
|Country
|Johnny Cash 01
|Jan 4, 2011
|
|
|-
|"Tennessee Flat Top Box"
|Johnny Cash
|1961
|Country
|Johnny Cash 01
|Jan 4, 2011
|
|
|-
|"The Ballad of Ira Hayes"
|Johnny Cash
|1964
|Country
|Johnny Cash 01
|Jan 4, 2011
|
|
|-
|"Visions"
|Abnormality
|2007
|Metal
|Rock Band Free 01
|Jan 4, 2011
|
|
|-
|"Get Clean"
|Anarchy Club
|2009
|Metal
|Rock Band Free 01
|Jan 4, 2011
|
|
|-
|"Night Lies"
|Bang Camaro
|2008
|Rock
|Rock Band Free 01
|Jan 4, 2011
|
|
|-
|"Shoulder to the Plow"
|Breaking Wheel
|2008
|Metal
|Rock Band Free 01
|Jan 4, 2011
|
|
|-
|"Welcome to the Neighborhood"
|Libyans
|2008
|Punk
|Rock Band Free 01
|Jan 4, 2011
|
|
|-
|"A Jagged Gorgeous Winter"
|
|2008
|Indie Rock
|Rock Band Free 01
|Jan 4, 2011
|
|
|-
|"Conventional Lover"
|Speck
|2007
|Pop-Rock
|Rock Band Free 01
|Jan 4, 2011
|
|
|-
|"Supreme Girl"
|
|2006
|Pop-Rock
|Rock Band Free 01
|Jan 4, 2011
|
|
|-
|"Rob the Prez-O-Dent"
|That Handsome Devil
|2008
|Rock
|Rock Band Free 01
|Jan 4, 2011
|
|
|-
|"Crawling"
|Linkin Park
|2000
|Nu-Metal
|Linkin Park 01
|Jan 11, 2011
|
|
|-
|"In the End"
|Linkin Park
|2000
|Nu-Metal
|Linkin Park 01
|Jan 11, 2011
|
|
|-
|"Numb"
|Linkin Park
|2003
|Nu-Metal
|Linkin Park 01
|Jan 11, 2011
|
|
|-
|"Somewhere I Belong"
|Linkin Park
|2003
|Nu-Metal
|Linkin Park 01
|Jan 11, 2011
|
|
|-
|"Waiting for the End"
|Linkin Park
|2010
|Nu-Metal
|Linkin Park 01
|Jan 11, 2011
|
|
|-
|"What I've Done"
|Linkin Park
|2007
|Nu-Metal
|Linkin Park 01
|Jan 11, 2011
|
|
|-
|"Made of Scars"
|Stone Sour
|2006
|Metal
|Stone Sour 01
|Jan 18, 2011
|
|
|-
|"Say You'll Haunt Me"
|Stone Sour
|2010
|Metal
|Stone Sour 01
|Jan 18, 2011
|
|
|-
|"Through Glass"
|Stone Sour
|2006
|Metal
|Stone Sour 01
|Jan 18, 2011
|
|
|-
|"Blue Jean"
|David Bowie
|1984
|Glam
|David Bowie 02
|Jan 25, 2011
|
|
|-
|"Fame"
|David Bowie
|1975
|Glam
|David Bowie 02
|Jan 25, 2011
|
|
|-
|"Modern Love"
|David Bowie
|1983
|Glam
|David Bowie 02
|Jan 25, 2011
|
|
|-
|"Young Americans"
|David Bowie
|1975
|Glam
|David Bowie 02
|Jan 25, 2011
|
|
|-
|"Ziggy Stardust"
|David Bowie
|1972
|Glam
|David Bowie 02
|Jan 25, 2011
|
|
|-
|"Freakshow"
|HourCast
|2010
|Rock
|Schick Promo Pack
|Feb 1, 2011
|
|
|-
|"Don't Feel Like That Anymore"
|Johnny Cooper
|2009
|Rock
|Schick Promo Pack
|Feb 1, 2011
|
|
|-
|"Appetite"
|
|2010
|Rock
|Schick Promo Pack
|Feb 1, 2011
|
|
|-
|"London Calling"
|
|1979
|Punk
|London Calling
|Feb 1, 2011
|
|
|-
|"Brand New Cadillac"
|
|1979
|Punk
|London Calling
|Feb 1, 2011
|
|
|-
|"Jimmy Jazz"
|
|1979
|Punk
|London Calling
|Feb 1, 2011
|
|
|-
|"Hateful"
|
|1979
|Punk
|London Calling
|Feb 1, 2011
|
|
|-
|"Rudie Can't Fail"
|
|1979
|Punk
|London Calling
|Feb 1, 2011
|
|
|-
|"Spanish Bombs"
|
|1979
|Punk
|London Calling
|Feb 1, 2011
|
|
|-
|"The Right Profile"
|
|1979
|Punk
|London Calling
|Feb 1, 2011
|
|
|-
|"Lost in the Supermarket"
|
|1979
|Punk
|London Calling
|Feb 1, 2011
|
|
|-
|"Clampdown"
|
|1979
|Punk
|London Calling
|Feb 1, 2011
|
|
|-
|"The Guns of Brixton"
|
|1979
|Punk
|London Calling
|Feb 1, 2011
|
|
|-
|"Wrong 'Em Boyo"
|
|1979
|Punk
|London Calling
|Feb 1, 2011
|
|
|-
|"Death or Glory"
|
|1979
|Punk
|London Calling
|Feb 1, 2011
|
|
|-
|"Koka Kola"
|
|1979
|Punk
|London Calling
|Feb 1, 2011
|
|
|-
|"The Card Cheat"
|
|1979
|Punk
|London Calling
|Feb 1, 2011
|
|
|-
|"Lover's Rock"
|
|1979
|Punk
|London Calling
|Feb 1, 2011
|
|
|-
|"Four Horsemen"
|
|1979
|Punk
|London Calling
|Feb 1, 2011
|
|
|-
|"I'm Not Down"
|
|1979
|Punk
|London Calling
|Feb 1, 2011
|
|
|-
|"Revolution Rock"
|
|1979
|Punk
|London Calling
|Feb 1, 2011
|
|
|-
|"Bend Down Low"
|Bob Marley and the Wailers
|1974
|Reggae/Ska
|Bob Marley 01
|Feb 8, 2011
|
|
|-
|"Burnin' and Lootin'"
|Bob Marley and the Wailers
|1973
|Reggae/Ska
|Bob Marley 01
|Feb 8, 2011
|
|
|-
|"Coming in from the Cold"
|Bob Marley and the Wailers
|1980
|Reggae/Ska
|Bob Marley 01
|Feb 8, 2011
|
|
|-
|"Kaya"
|Bob Marley and the Wailers
|1978
|Reggae/Ska
|Bob Marley 01
|Feb 8, 2011
|
|
|-
|"Lively Up Yourself"
|Bob Marley and the Wailers
|1974
|Reggae/Ska
|Bob Marley 01
|Feb 8, 2011
|
|
|-
|"No More Trouble"
|Bob Marley and the Wailers
|1973
|Reggae/Ska
|Bob Marley 01
|Feb 8, 2011
|
|
|-
|"Small Axe"
|Bob Marley and the Wailers
|1973
|Reggae/Ska
|Bob Marley 01
|Feb 8, 2011
|
|
|-
|"Them Belly Full (But We Hungry)"
|Bob Marley and the Wailers
|1974
|Reggae/Ska
|Bob Marley 01
|Feb 8, 2011
|
|
|-
|"Obsession"
|Animotion
|1984
|New Wave
|February Heartache Duets' Pack
|Feb 11, 2011
|
|
|-
|"Airplanes"
|B.o.B (featuring Hayley Williams)
|2010
|Hip-Hop/Rap
|February Heartache Duets' Pack
|Feb 11, 2011
|
|
|-
|"Total Eclipse of the Heart"
|Bonnie Tyler
|1983
|Pop-Rock
|February Heartache Duets' Pack
|Feb 11, 2011
|
|
|-
|"Don't You Want Me"
|
|1981
|Pop/Dance/Electronic
|February Heartache Duets' Pack
|Feb 11, 2011
|
|
|-
|"Need You Now"
|Lady Antebellum
|2010
|Country
|February Heartache Duets' Pack
|Feb 11, 2011
|
|
|-
|"Paradise by the Dashboard Light"
|Meat Loaf
|1977
|Classic Rock
|February Heartache Duets' Pack
|Feb 11, 2011
|
|
|-
|"Stop Draggin' My Heart Around"
|Stevie Nicks
|1981
|Classic Rock
|February Heartache Duets' Pack
|Feb 11, 2011
|
|
|-
|"Fire and Ice"
|Pat Benatar
|1981
|Classic Rock
|Pat Benatar 01
|Feb 22, 2011
|
|
|-
|"Love is a Battlefield"
|Pat Benatar
|1983
|Classic Rock
|Pat Benatar 01
|Feb 22, 2011
|
|
|-
|"Shadows of the Night"
|Pat Benatar
|1982
|Classic Rock
|Pat Benatar 01
|Feb 22, 2011
|
|
|-
|"We Belong"
|Pat Benatar
|1984
|Classic Rock
|Pat Benatar 01
|Feb 22, 2011
|
|
|-
|"Invincible"
|Pat Benatar
|1985
|Classic Rock
|Pat Benatar 01
|Feb 22, 2011
|
|
|-
|"Promises in the Dark"
|Pat Benatar
|1981
|Classic Rock
|Pat Benatar 01
|Feb 22, 2011
|
|
|-
|"Terrible Lie"
|Nine Inch Nails
|1989
|Rock
|Pretty Hate Pack 01
|Mar 1, 2011
|
|
|-
|"Head Like a Hole"
|Nine Inch Nails
|1989
|Rock
|Pretty Hate Pack 01
|Mar 1, 2011
|
|
|-
|"Sanctified"
|Nine Inch Nails
|1989
|Rock
|Pretty Hate Pack 01
|Mar 1, 2011
|
|
|-
|"The Only Time"
|Nine Inch Nails
|1989
|Rock
|Pretty Hate Pack 01
|Mar 1, 2011
|
|
|-
|"Never Let Me Down Again"
|Depeche Mode
|1987
|Pop/Dance/Electronic
|Depeche Mode 01
|Mar 8, 2011
|
|
|-
|"Personal Jesus"
|Depeche Mode
|1990
|Pop/Dance/Electronic
|Depeche Mode 01
|Mar 8, 2011
|
|
|-
|"Policy of Truth"
|Depeche Mode
|1990
|Pop/Dance/Electronic
|Depeche Mode 01
|Mar 8, 2011
|
|
|-
|"I Will Possess Your Heart"
|Death Cab for Cutie
|2008
|Indie Rock
|
|Mar 8, 2011
|
|
|-
|"Shooting the Moon"
|OK Go
|2010
|Pop-Rock
|
|Mar 15, 2011
|
|
|-
|"Every Breath You Take"
|
|1983
|Rock
|
|Mar 15, 2011
|
|
|-
|"So Lonely"
|
|1978
|Rock
|
|Mar 15, 2011
|
|
|-
|"Spill the Wine"
|War
|1970
|R&B/Soul/Funk
|
|Mar 15, 2011
|
|
|-
|"I Go to Extremes"
|Billy Joel
|1989
|Classic Rock
|Billy Joel Piano Challenge
|Mar 22, 2011
|
|
|-
|"Miami 2017 (Seen the Lights Go Out on Broadway)"
|Billy Joel
|1976
|Classic Rock
|Billy Joel Piano Challenge
|Mar 22, 2011
|
|
|-
|"My Life"
|Billy Joel
|1978
|Classic Rock
|Billy Joel Piano Challenge
|Mar 22, 2011
|
|
|-
|"Prelude/Angry Young Man"
|Billy Joel
|1976
|Classic Rock
|Billy Joel Piano Challenge
|Mar 22, 2011
|
|
|-
|"Scenes from an Italian Restaurant"
|Billy Joel
|1977
|Classic Rock
|Billy Joel Piano Challenge
|Mar 22, 2011
|
|
|-
|"She's Always a Woman"
|Billy Joel
|1977
|Classic Rock
|Billy Joel Piano Challenge
|Mar 22, 2011
|
|
|-
|"Somebody to Love"
|Jefferson Airplane
|1967
|Classic Rock
|Days of Peace 01
|Mar 29, 2011
|
|
|-
|"Spinning Wheel"
|Blood, Sweat & Tears
|1968
|Classic Rock
|Days of Peace 01
|Mar 29, 2011
|
|
|-
|"Black Magic Woman"
|Santana
|1970
|Classic Rock
|Days of Peace 01
|Mar 29, 2011
|
|
|-
|"Through the Fire and Flames"
|DragonForce
|2006
|Metal
|
|Mar 29, 2011
|
|
|-
|"Operation Ground and Pound"
|DragonForce
|2006
|Metal
|
|Mar 29, 2011
|
|
|-
|"The Loco-Motion"
|Grand Funk Railroad
|1974
|Classic Rock
|
|Apr 5, 2011
|
|
|-
|"We're an American Band"
|Grand Funk Railroad
|1973
|Classic Rock
|
|Apr 5, 2011
|
|
|-
|"Freeze-Frame"
|J. Geils Band
|1981
|Rock
|
|Apr 5, 2011
|
|
|-
|"Love Will Tear Us Apart"
|Joy Division
|1980
|New Wave
|
|Apr 5, 2011
|
|
|-
|"Dreams"
|Fleetwood Mac
|1977
|Classic Rock
|Fleetwood Mac/Stevie Nicks 01
|Apr 12, 2011
|
|
|-
|"Gold Dust Woman"
|Fleetwood Mac
|1977
|Classic Rock
|Fleetwood Mac/Stevie Nicks 01
|Apr 12, 2011
|
|
|-
|"Landslide"
|Fleetwood Mac
|1975
|Classic Rock
|Fleetwood Mac/Stevie Nicks 01
|Apr 12, 2011
|
|
|-
|"Rhiannon"
|Fleetwood Mac
|1975
|Classic Rock
|Fleetwood Mac/Stevie Nicks 01
|Apr 12, 2011
|
|
|-
|"Edge of Seventeen (Just Like the White Winged Dove)"
|Stevie Nicks
|1981
|Classic Rock
|Fleetwood Mac/Stevie Nicks 01
|Apr 12, 2011
|
|
|-
|"Stand Back"
|Stevie Nicks
|1983
|Classic Rock
|Fleetwood Mac/Stevie Nicks 01
|Apr 12, 2011
|
|
|-
| "Breaking"
|Anberlin
|2008
|Alternative
|
|Apr 19, 2011
|
|
|-
|"Blood and Thunder"
|Mastodon
|2004
|Metal
|
|Apr 19, 2011
|
|
|-
|"Fire"
|Ohio Players
|1974
|R&B/Soul/Funk
|
|Apr 19, 2011
|
|
|-
|"Love Rollercoaster"
|Ohio Players
|1975
|R&B/Soul/Funk
|
|Apr 19, 2011
|
|
|-
|"Must Have Done Something Right"
|Relient K
|2007
|Pop-Rock
|
|Apr 19, 2011
|
|
|-
|"867-5309/Jenny"
|Tommy Tutone
|1981
|Rock
|
|Apr 19, 2011
|
|
|-
|"Blue Bayou"
|Roy Orbison
|1963
|Classic Rock
|Roy Orbison: 75th Birthday Pack
|Apr 26, 2011
|
|
|-
|"Dream Baby (How Long Must I Dream)"
|Roy Orbison
|1962
|Classic Rock
|Roy Orbison: 75th Birthday Pack
|Apr 26, 2011
|
|
|-
|"Only the Lonely (Know the Way I Feel)"
|Roy Orbison
|1960
|Classic Rock
|Roy Orbison: 75th Birthday Pack
|Apr 26, 2011
|
|
|-
|"Rock and Roll All Nite" (Live)
|Kiss
|1975
|Classic Rock
|
|Apr 26, 2011
|
|
|-
|"Strutter" (Live)
|Kiss
|1975
|Classic Rock
|
|Apr 26, 2011
|
|
|-
|"Do You Really Want to Hurt Me"
|Culture Club
|1982
|New Wave
|
|May 3, 2011
|
|
|-
|"From Out of Nowhere"
|Faith No More
|1989
|Rock
|
|May 3, 2011
|
|
|-
|"Working for the Weekend"
|Loverboy
|1981
|Pop-Rock
|
|May 3, 2011
|
|
|-
| "Stash"
|Phish
|1992
|Rock
|
|May 3, 2011
|
|
|-
|"Tweezer"
|Phish
|1992
|Rock
|
|May 3, 2011
|
|
|-
|"Big Bang Baby"
|Stone Temple Pilots
|1996
|Alternative
|
|May 3, 2011
|
|
|-
|"Long Road to Ruin"
|Foo Fighters
|2007
|Alternative
|Foo Fighters 04
|May 10, 2011
|
|
|-
|"Rope"
|Foo Fighters
|2011
|Alternative
|Foo Fighters 04
|May 10, 2011
|
|
|-
|"Stacked Actors"
|Foo Fighters
|1999
|Alternative
|Foo Fighters 04
|May 10, 2011
|
|
|-
|"Walk"
|Foo Fighters
|2011
|Alternative
|Foo Fighters 04
|May 10, 2011
|
|
|-
|"Hard Rock Hallelujah"
|Lordi
|2006
|Metal
|
|May 10, 2011
|
|
|-
|"King of Rock"
|Run-DMC
|1985
|Hip-Hop/Rap
|
|May 10, 2011
|
|
|-
|"5 Minutes Alone"
|Pantera
|1994
|Metal
|Pantera 01
|May 19, 2011
|
|
|-
|"Walk"
|Pantera
|1992
|Metal
|Pantera 01
|May 19, 2011
|
|
|-
|"Mouth for War"
|Pantera
|1992
|Metal
|Pantera 01
|May 19, 2011
|
|
|-
|"I'm Broken"
|Pantera
|1994
|Metal
|Pantera 01
|May 19, 2011
|
|
|-
|"Do You Feel Like We Do" (Live)|Peter Frampton
|1976
|Rock
|
|May 19, 2011
|
|
|-
|"Born This Way"
|Lady Gaga
|2011
|Pop/Dance/Electronic
|Lady Gaga 02
|May 23, 2011
|
|
|-
|"LoveGame"
|Lady Gaga
|2008
|Pop/Dance/Electronic
|Lady Gaga 02
|May 23, 2011
|
|
|-
|"Paparazzi"
|Lady Gaga
|2008
|Pop/Dance/Electronic
|Lady Gaga 02
|May 23, 2011
|
|
|-
|"Hot Blooded"
|Foreigner
|1978
|Classic Rock
|
|May 23, 2011
|
|
|-
|"Urgent"
|Foreigner
|1981
|Classic Rock
|
|May 23, 2011
|
|
|-
|"Mr. Crowley"
|Ozzy Osbourne
|1980
|Metal
|Ozzy Osbourne 8-Pack
|May 31, 2011
|
|
|-
|"Over the Mountain"
|Ozzy Osbourne
|1981
|Metal
|Ozzy Osbourne 8-Pack
|May 31, 2011
|
|
|-
|"Bark at the Moon"
|Ozzy Osbourne
|1983
|Metal
|Ozzy Osbourne 8-Pack
|May 31, 2011
|
|
|-
|"Mama, I'm Coming Home"
|Ozzy Osbourne
|1991
|Metal
|Ozzy Osbourne 8-Pack
|May 31, 2011
|
|
|-
|"Steal Away (The Night)"
|Ozzy Osbourne
|1980
|Metal
|Ozzy Osbourne 8-Pack
|May 31, 2011
|
|
|-
|"Flying High Again"
|Ozzy Osbourne
|1981
|Metal
|Ozzy Osbourne 8-Pack
|May 31, 2011
|
|
|-
|"Diary of a Madman"
|Ozzy Osbourne
|1981
|Metal
|Ozzy Osbourne 8-Pack
|May 31, 2011
|
|
|-
|"I Don't Know"
|Ozzy Osbourne
|1980
|Metal
|Ozzy Osbourne 8-Pack
|May 31, 2011
|
|
|-
|"Grenade"
|Bruno Mars
|2010
|Pop-Rock
|Bruno Mars 01
|Jun 7, 2011
|
|
|-
|"Just the Way You Are"
|Bruno Mars
|2010
|Pop-Rock
|Bruno Mars 01
|Jun 7, 2011
|
|
|-
|"Marry You"
|Bruno Mars
|2010
|Pop-Rock
|Bruno Mars 01
|Jun 7, 2011
|
|
|-
|"Audience of One"
|Rise Against
|2008
|Punk
|Rise Against 02
|Jun 7, 2011
|
|
|-
|"Help Is on the Way"
|Rise Against
|2011
|Punk
|Rise Against 02
|Jun 7, 2011
|
|
|-
|""
|Rise Against
|2006
|Punk
|Rise Against 02
|Jun 7, 2011
|
|
|-
|"Take On Me"
|
|1985
|New Wave
|
|Jun 14, 2011
|
|
|-
|"Unholy Confessions"
|Avenged Sevenfold
|2003
|Metal
|
|Jun 14, 2011
|
|
|-
|"Welcome to the Family"
|Avenged Sevenfold
|2010
|Metal
|
|Jun 14, 2011
|
|
|-
|"Tubthumping"
|Chumbawamba
|1997
|Pop-Rock
|
|Jun 14, 2011
|
|
|-
|"I Alone"
|Live
|1994
|Alternative
|
|Jun 14, 2011
|
|
|-
|"Lightning Crashes"
|Live
|1994
|Alternative
|
|Jun 14, 2011
|
|
|-
|"Misery"
|Maroon 5
|2010
|Pop-Rock
|Maroon 5 02
|Jun 21, 2011
|
|
|-
|"This Love"
|Maroon 5
|2002
|Pop-Rock
|Maroon 5 02
|Jun 21, 2011
|
|
|-
|"Won't Go Home Without You"
|Maroon 5
|2007
|Pop-Rock
|Maroon 5 02
|Jun 21, 2011
|
|
|-
|"Blurry"
|Puddle of Mudd
|2001
|Alternative
|Puddle of Mudd 01
|Jun 21, 2011
|
|
|-
|"Control"
|Puddle of Mudd
|2001
|Alternative
|Puddle of Mudd 01
|Jun 21, 2011
|
|
|-
|"She Hates Me"
|Puddle of Mudd
|2001
|Alternative
|Puddle of Mudd 01
|Jun 21, 2011
|
|
|-
|"Here Without You"
|3 Doors Down
|2002
|Rock
|3 Doors Down 01
|Jun 28, 2011
|
|
|-
|"When I'm Gone"
|3 Doors Down
|2002
|Rock
|3 Doors Down 01
|Jun 28, 2011
|
|
|-
|"When You're Young"
|3 Doors Down
|2011
|Rock
|3 Doors Down 01
|Jun 28, 2011
|
|
|-
|"Nothin' but a Good Time"
|Poison
|1988
|Glam
|Poison 01
|Jun 28, 2011
|
|
|-
|"Talk Dirty to Me"
|Poison
|1986
|Glam
|Poison 01
|Jun 28, 2011
|
|
|-
|"Unskinny Bop"
|Poison
|1990
|Glam
|Poison 01
|Jun 28, 2011
|
|
|-
|"For What It's Worth"
|Buffalo Springfield
|1967
|Classic Rock
|
|Jul 5, 2011
|
|
|-
|"Man on the Moon"
|R.E.M.
|1992
|Alternative
|
|Jul 5, 2011
|
|
|-
|"Aerials"
|System of a Down
|2001
|Nu-Metal
|
|Jul 5, 2011
|
|
|-
|"Hypnotize"
|System of a Down
|2005
|Nu-Metal
|
|Jul 5, 2011
|
|
|-
|"Turning Japanese"
|
|1980
|Punk
|
|Jul 5, 2011
|
|
|-
|"A Little Respect"
|Erasure
|1988
|New Wave
|
|Jul 12, 2011
|
|
|-
|"Relax (Come Fighting)"
|Frankie Goes to Hollywood
|1984
|Pop/Dance/Electronic
|
|Jul 12, 2011
|
|
|-
|"Boom"
|P.O.D.
|2001
|Nu-Metal
|
|Jul 12, 2011
|
|
|-
|"Youth of the Nation"
|P.O.D.
|2001
|Nu-Metal
|
|Jul 12, 2011
|
|
|-
|"Blow Up the Outside World"
|Soundgarden
|1996
|Grunge
|Celebrating Soundgarden On Tour 2011
|Jul 19, 2011
|
|
|-
|"Burden in My Hand"
|Soundgarden
|1996
|Grunge
|Celebrating Soundgarden On Tour 2011
|Jul 19, 2011
|
|
|-
|"Fell on Black Days"
|Soundgarden
|1994
|Grunge
|Celebrating Soundgarden On Tour 2011
|Jul 19, 2011
|
|
|-
|"Outshined"
|Soundgarden
|1991
|Grunge
|Celebrating Soundgarden On Tour 2011
|Jul 19, 2011
|
|
|-
|"Rusty Cage"
|Soundgarden
|1991
|Grunge
|Celebrating Soundgarden On Tour 2011
|Jul 19, 2011
|
|
|-
|"The Day I Tried to Live"
|Soundgarden
|1994
|Grunge
|Celebrating Soundgarden On Tour 2011
|Jul 19, 2011
|
|
|-
|"Heart of the Sunrise"
|Yes
|1971
|Prog
|Yes 01
|Jul 26, 2011
|
|
|-
|"I've Seen All Good People"
|Yes
|1971
|Prog
|Yes 01
|Jul 26, 2011
|
|
|-
|"Owner of a Lonely Heart"
|Yes
|1983
|Prog
|Yes 01
|Jul 26, 2011
|
|
|-
|"South Side of the Sky"
|Yes
|1971
|Prog
|Yes 01
|Jul 26, 2011
|
|
|-
|"Starship Trooper"
|Yes
|1971
|Prog
|Yes 01
|Jul 26, 2011
|
|
|-
|"Make Some Noise"
|Beastie Boys
|2011
|Hip-Hop/Rap
|
|Aug 2, 2011
|
|
|-
|"No Sleep till Brooklyn"
|Beastie Boys
|1986
|Hip-Hop/Rap
|
|Aug 2, 2011
|
|
|-
|"Barracuda"
|Heart
|1977
|Classic Rock
|
|Aug 2, 2011
|
|
|-
|"Super Bad, Pts. 1 & 2"
|James Brown
|1970
|R&B/Soul/Funk
|
|Aug 2, 2011
|
|
|-
|"Tell Me Something Good"
|Rufus (featuring Chaka Khan)
|1974
|R&B/Soul/Funk
|
|Aug 2, 2011
|
|
|-
|"Animal" (Live)
|Def Leppard
|2011
|Rock
|Def Leppard 01
|Aug 9, 2011
|
|
|-
|"Bringin' On the Heartbreak"
|Def Leppard
|1981
|Rock
|Def Leppard 01
|Aug 9, 2011
|
|
|-
|"Photograph"
|Def Leppard
|1983
|Rock
|Def Leppard 01
|Aug 9, 2011
|
|
|-
|"Pour Some Sugar on Me" (Live)
|Def Leppard
|2011
|Rock
|Def Leppard 01
|Aug 9, 2011
|
|
|-
|"Rock of Ages"
|Def Leppard
|1983
|Rock
|Def Leppard 01
|Aug 9, 2011
|
|
|-
|"Undefeated"
|Def Leppard
|2011
|Rock
|Def Leppard 01
|Aug 9, 2011
|
|
|-
|"Dance, Dance"
|Fall Out Boy
|2005
|Pop-Rock
|Fall Out Boy 01
|Aug 16, 2011
|
|
|-
|"Sugar, We're Goin Down"
|Fall Out Boy
|2005
|Pop-Rock
|Fall Out Boy 01
|Aug 16, 2011
|
|
|-
|"Thnks fr th Mmrs"
|Fall Out Boy
|2007
|Pop-Rock
|Fall Out Boy 01
|Aug 16, 2011
|
|
|-
|"Child in Time"
|Deep Purple
|1970
|Prog
|
|Aug 16, 2011
|
|
|-
|"Adolescents"
|Incubus
|2011
|Alternative
|Incubus 01
|Aug 23, 2011
|
|
|-
|"Pardon Me"
|Incubus
|1999
|Alternative
|Incubus 01
|Aug 23, 2011
|
|
|-
|"Wish You Were Here"
|Incubus
|2001
|Alternative
|Incubus 01
|Aug 23, 2011
|
|
|-
|"By the Way"
|Red Hot Chili Peppers
|2002
|Alternative
|I'm With the Chili Peppers
|Aug 30, 2011
|
|
|-
|"Californication"
|Red Hot Chili Peppers
|1999
|Alternative
|I'm With the Chili Peppers
|Aug 30, 2011
|
|
|-
|"Look Around"
|Red Hot Chili Peppers
|2011
|Alternative
|I'm With the Chili Peppers
|Aug 30, 2011
|
|
|-
|"Monarchy of Roses"
|Red Hot Chili Peppers
|2011
|Alternative
|I'm With the Chili Peppers
|Aug 30, 2011
|
|
|-
|"Otherside"
|Red Hot Chili Peppers
|1999
|Alternative
|I'm With the Chili Peppers
|Aug 30, 2011
|
|
|-
|"Parallel Universe"
|Red Hot Chili Peppers
|1999
|Alternative
|I'm With the Chili Peppers
|Aug 30, 2011
|
|
|-
|"Scar Tissue"
|Red Hot Chili Peppers
|1999
|Alternative
|I'm With the Chili Peppers
|Aug 30, 2011
|
|
|-
|"The Adventures of Rain Dance Maggie"
|Red Hot Chili Peppers
|2011
|Alternative
|I'm With the Chili Peppers
|Aug 30, 2011
|
|
|-
|"I Want You to Want Me" (Live)
|Cheap Trick
|1979
|Pop-Rock
|Cheap Trick 01
|Sep 6, 2011
|
|
|-
|"Surrender" (Live)
|Cheap Trick
|1979
|Pop-Rock
|Cheap Trick 01
|Sep 6, 2011
|
|
|-
|"Dream Police"
|Cheap Trick
|1979
|Pop-Rock
|Cheap Trick 01
|Sep 6, 2011
|
|
|-
|"Unbelievable"
|EMF
|1991
|Pop/Dance/Electronic
|
|Sep 6, 2011
|
|
|-
|"Me and Bobby McGee"
|Janis Joplin & the Full Tilt Boogie Band
|1971
|Classic Rock
|
|Sep 13, 2011
|
|
|-
|"Hash Pipe"
|Weezer
|2001
|Alternative
|Weezer 04
|Sep 13, 2011
|
|
|-
|"Island in the Sun"
|Weezer
|2001
|Alternative
|Weezer 04
|Sep 13, 2011
|
|
|-
|"Perfect Situation"
|Weezer
|2005
|Alternative
|Weezer 04
|Sep 13, 2011
|
|
|-
|"Heart-Shaped Box"
|Nirvana
|1993
|Grunge
|Celebrating Nirvana
|Sep 20, 2011
|
|
|-
|"Rape Me"
|Nirvana
|1993
|Grunge
|Celebrating Nirvana
|Sep 20, 2011
|
|
|-
|"All Apologies"
|Nirvana
|1993
|Grunge
|Celebrating Nirvana
|Sep 20, 2011
|
|
|-
|"You Know You're Right"
|Nirvana
|2002
|Grunge
|Celebrating Nirvana
|Sep 20, 2011
|
|
|-
|"Wait and Bleed"
|Slipknot
|1999
|Nu-Metal
|Slipknot 02
|Sep 27, 2011
|
|
|-
|"Left Behind"
|Slipknot
|2001
|Nu-Metal
|Slipknot 02
|Sep 27, 2011
|
|
|-
|"Pulse of the Maggots"
|Slipknot
|2004
|Nu-Metal
|Slipknot 02
|Sep 27, 2011
|
|
|-
|"Snuff"
|Slipknot
|2008
|Nu-Metal
|Slipknot 02
|Sep 27, 2011
|
|
|-
|"Gold Cobra"
|Limp Bizkit
|2011
|Nu-Metal
|Limp Bizkit 01
|Oct 4, 2011
|
|
|-
|"Nookie"
|Limp Bizkit
|1999
|Nu-Metal
|Limp Bizkit 01
|Oct 4, 2011
|
|
|-
||"My Way"
|Limp Bizkit
|2000
|Nu-Metal
|Limp Bizkit 01
|Oct 4, 2011
|
|
|-
|"Re-Arranged"
|Limp Bizkit
|1999
|Nu-Metal
|Limp Bizkit 01
|Oct 4, 2011
|
|
|-
|"Rock the Casbah"
|
|1982
|Punk
|
|Oct 11, 2011
|
|
|-
|"The Party Song"
|Blink-182
|1999
|Punk
|Blink-182 03
|Oct 11, 2011
|
|
|-
|"Stay Together for the Kids"
|Blink-182
|2001
|Punk
|Blink-182 03
|Oct 11, 2011
|
|
|-
|"Up All Night"
|Blink-182
|2011
|Punk
|Blink-182 03
|Oct 11, 2011
|
|
|-
|"Yellow"
|Coldplay
|2000
|Alternative
|Coldplay Collection 01
|Oct 18, 2011
|
|
|-
|"The Scientist"
|Coldplay
|2002
|Alternative
|Coldplay Collection 01
|Oct 18, 2011
|
|
|-
|"Clocks"
|Coldplay
|2002
|Alternative
|Coldplay Collection 01
|Oct 18, 2011
|
|
|-
|"Fix You"
|Coldplay
|2005
|Alternative
|Coldplay Collection 01
|Oct 18, 2011
|
|
|-
|"Viva la Vida"
|Coldplay
|2008
|Alternative
|Coldplay Collection 01
|Oct 18, 2011
|
|
|-
|"Every Teardrop Is a Waterfall"
|Coldplay
|2011
|Alternative
|Coldplay Collection 01
|Oct 18, 2011
|
|
|-
|"I Believe in a Thing Called Love"
|
|2003
|Glam
|
|Oct 25, 2011
|
|
|-
|"Living Dead Girl"
|Rob Zombie
|1998
|Nu-Metal
|
|Oct 25, 2011
|
|
|-
|"Thunder Kiss '65"
|White Zombie
|1992
|Metal
|
|Oct 25, 2011
|
|
|-
|"Super-Charger Heaven"
|White Zombie
|1995
|Metal
|
|Oct 25, 2011
|
|
|-
|"Sooner or Later"
|Breaking Benjamin
|2004
|Rock
|Breaking Benjamin 02
|Nov 1, 2011
|
|
|-
|"Breath"
|Breaking Benjamin
|2006
|Rock
|Breaking Benjamin 02
|Nov 1, 2011
|
|
|-
|"Until the End"
|Breaking Benjamin
|2006
|Rock
|Breaking Benjamin 02
|Nov 1, 2011
|
|
|-
|"Forever"
|Papa Roach
|2006
|Nu-Metal
|
|Nov 1, 2011
|
|
|-
|"Single White Female" (RB3 Version)
|Chely Wright
|1999
|Country
|Going Country 05
|Nov 8, 2011
|
|
|-
|"Giddy On Up" (RB3 Version)
|Laura Bell Bundy
|2010
|Country
|Going Country 05
|Nov 8, 2011
|
|
|-
|"The Night The Lights Went Out in Georgia" (RB3 Version)
|Reba McEntire
|1991
|Country
|Going Country 05
|Nov 8, 2011
|
|
|-
|"Party for Two" (With Billy Currington) (RB3 Version)
|Shania Twain
|2004
|Country
|Going Country 05
|Nov 8, 2011
|
|
|-
|"Settlin'" (RB3 Version)
|Sugarland
|2006
|Country
|Going Country 05
|Nov 8, 2011
|
|
|-
|"That's How Country Boys Roll" (RB3 Version)
|Billy Currington
|2008
|Country
|Going Country 06
|Nov 8, 2011
|
|
|-
|"Awful Beautiful Life" (RB3 Version)
|Darryl Worley
|2004
|Country
|Going Country 06
|Nov 8, 2011
|
|
|-
|"Man of Me" (RB3 Version)
|Gary Allan
|2001
|Country
|Going Country 06
|Nov 8, 2011
|
|
|-
|"Twang" (RB3 Version)
|George Strait
|2009
|Country
|Going Country 06
|Nov 8, 2011
|
|
|-
|"Ring of Fire" (RB3 Version)
|Johnny Cash
|1963
|Country
|Going Country 06
|Nov 8, 2011
|
|
|-
|"Backwoods" (RB3 Version)
|Justin Moore
|2009
|Country
|Going Country 06
|Nov 8, 2011
|
|
|-
|"Alright" (RB3 Version)
|Darius Rucker
|2008
|Country
|Going Country 07
|Nov 8, 2011
|
|
|-
|"Sideways" (RB3 Version)
|Dierks Bentley
|2009
|Country
|Going Country 07
|Nov 8, 2011
|
|
|-
|"Kiss a Girl" (RB3 Version)
|Keith Urban
|2009
|Country
|Going Country 07
|Nov 8, 2011
|
|
|-
|"Perfect Day" (RB3 Version)
|Lady Antebellum
|2010
|Country
|Going Country 07
|Nov 8, 2011
|
|
|-
|"Rain Is a Good Thing" (RB3 Version)
|Luke Bryan
|2009
|Country
|Going Country 07
|Nov 8, 2011
|
|
|-
|"Mama Tried" (RB3 Version)
|Merle Haggard
|1968
|Country
|Going Country 07
|Nov 8, 2011
|
|
|-
|"Ride" (RB3 Version)
|Trace Adkins
|2006
|Country
|Going Country 07
|Nov 8, 2011
|
|
|-
|"Intentional Heartache" (RB3 Version)
|Dwight Yoakam
|2005
|Country
|Going Country 08
|Nov 8, 2011
|
|
|-
|"Crazy Town" (RB3 Version)
|Jason Aldean
|2009
|Country
|Going Country 08
|Nov 8, 2011
|
|
|-
|"Summer Nights" (RB3 Version)
|Rascal Flatts
|2009
|Country
|Going Country 08
|Nov 8, 2011
|
|
|-
|"Superstition"
|Stevie Wonder
|1972
|R&B/Soul/Funk
|Stevie Wonder 01
|Nov 15, 2011
|
|
|-
|"Higher Ground"
|Stevie Wonder
|1973
|R&B/Soul/Funk
|Stevie Wonder 01
|Nov 15, 2011
|
|
|-
|"Living for the City"
|Stevie Wonder
|1973
|R&B/Soul/Funk
|Stevie Wonder 01
|Nov 15, 2011
|
|
|-
|"Sir Duke"
|Stevie Wonder
|1976
|R&B/Soul/Funk
|Stevie Wonder 01
|Nov 15, 2011
|
|
|-
|"I Wish"
|Stevie Wonder
|1976
|R&B/Soul/Funk
|Stevie Wonder 01
|Nov 15, 2011
|
|
|-
|"How You Remind Me"
|Nickelback
|2001
|Rock
|Nickelback Then and Now
|Nov 22, 2011
|
|
|-
|"Someday"
|Nickelback
|2003
|Rock
|Nickelback Then and Now
|Nov 22, 2011
|
|
|-
|"Animals"
|Nickelback
|2005
|Rock
|Nickelback Then and Now
|Nov 22, 2011
|
|
|-
|"If Today Was Your Last Day"
|Nickelback
|2008
|Rock
|Nickelback Then and Now
|Nov 22, 2011
|
|
|-
|"This Means War"
|Nickelback
|2011
|Rock
|Nickelback Then and Now
|Nov 22, 2011
|
|
|-
|"On the Backs of Angels"
|Dream Theater
|2011
|Prog
|Roadrunner Records 02
|Nov 29, 2011
|
|
|-
|"Ghost of Perdition"
|Opeth
|2005
|Prog
|Roadrunner Records 02
|Nov 29, 2011
|
|
|-
|"In Waves"
|Trivium
|2011
|Metal
|Roadrunner Records 02
|Nov 29, 2011
|
|
|-
|"We Built This City"
|Starship
|1985
|Pop-Rock
|
|Nov 29, 2011
|
|
|-
|"Seven Seas of Rhye"
|Queen
|1974
|Classic Rock
|Queen Extravaganza 02
|Dec 6, 2011
|
|
|-
|"Stone Cold Crazy"
|Queen
|1974
|Classic Rock
|Queen Extravaganza 02
|Dec 6, 2011
|
|
|-
|"I'm in Love With My Car"
|Queen
|1975
|Classic Rock
|Queen Extravaganza 02
|Dec 6, 2011
|
|
|-
|"You're My Best Friend"
|Queen
|1975
|Classic Rock
|Queen Extravaganza 02
|Dec 6, 2011
|
|
|-
|"Long Away"
|Queen
|1976
|Classic Rock
|Queen Extravaganza 02
|Dec 6, 2011
|
|
|-
|"Bicycle Race"
|Queen
|1978
|Classic Rock
|Queen Extravaganza 02
|Dec 6, 2011
|
|
|-
|"Don't Stop Me Now"
|Queen
|1978
|Classic Rock
|Queen Extravaganza 02
|Dec 6, 2011
|
|
|-
|"Radio Ga Ga"
|Queen
|1984
|Classic Rock
|Queen Extravaganza 02
|Dec 6, 2011
|
|
|-
|"The Show Must Go On"
|Queen
|1991
|Classic Rock
|Queen Extravaganza 02
|Dec 6, 2011
|
|
|-
| "Fly By Night"
| Rush
|1975
|Prog
| Rush 01
| Dec 13, 2011
| 
| 
|-
| "Caravan"
| Rush
|2010
|Prog
| Rush 01
| Dec 13, 2011
| 
| 
|-
| "The Spirit of Radio (Live)"
| Rush
|1980
|Prog
| Rush 01
| Dec 13, 2011
| 
| 
|-
| "Rebel Love Song"
| Black Veil Brides
|2011
|Rock
| 
| Dec 13, 2011
| 
| 
|-
| "A Warrior's Call"
| Volbeat
|2010
|Metal
| 
| Dec 13, 2011
| 
| 
|-
|"Long Hot Summer Night"
|
|1968
|Classic Rock
|Experience Hendrix 01
|Dec 20, 2011
|
| 
|-
|"Gypsy Eyes"
|
|1968
|Classic Rock
|Experience Hendrix 01
|Dec 20, 2011
|
| 
|-
|"All Along the Watchtower"
|
|1968
|Classic Rock
|Experience Hendrix 01
|Dec 20, 2011
|
| 
|-
|"Voodoo Child (Slight Return) (Live)"
|Jimi Hendrix
|1969
|Classic Rock
|Experience Hendrix 01
|Dec 20, 2011
|
| 
|-
|"Dolly Dagger"
|Jimi Hendrix
|1971
|Classic Rock
|Experience Hendrix 01
|Dec 20, 2011
|
| 
|-
|"Freedom"
|Jimi Hendrix
|1971
|Classic Rock
|Experience Hendrix 01
|Dec 20, 2011
|
| 
|-
|"Angel"
|Jimi Hendrix
|1971
|Classic Rock
|Experience Hendrix 01
|Dec 20, 2011
|
|
|-
|"You Make Me Feel..."
|Cobra Starship (ft. Sabi)
|2011
|Pop/Dance/Electronic
|Fueled by Ramen 01
|Dec 27, 2011
|
|
|-
|"Stereo Hearts"
|Gym Class Heroes (ft. Adam Levine)
|2011
|Hip-Hop/Rap
|Fueled by Ramen 01
|Dec 27, 2011
|
|
|-
|"I Write Sins Not Tragedies"
|Panic! at the Disco
|2005
|Emo
|Fueled by Ramen 01
|Dec 27, 2011
|
|
|-
|"Pressure"
|Paramore
|2005
|Pop-Rock
|Fueled by Ramen 01
|Dec 27, 2011
|
|
|-
|"Panic"
|Sublime with Rome
|2011
|Reggae/Ska
|Fueled by Ramen 01
|Dec 27, 2011
|
|
|-
|"Billionaire"
|Travie McCoy (ft. Bruno Mars)
|2010
|Hip-Hop/Rap
|Fueled by Ramen 01
|Dec 27, 2011
|
|
|-
|"2112"
|Rush
|1976
|Prog
|Rush '2112'
|Dec 31, 2011
|
|
|-
|"2112: Overture, The Temples of Syrinx"
|Rush
|1976
|Prog
|Rush '2112'
|Dec 31, 2011
|
|
|-
|"2112: Discovery, Presentation"
|Rush
|1976
|Prog
|Rush '2112'
|Dec 31, 2011
|
|
|-
|"2112: Oracle: The Dream, Soliloquy, Grand Finale"
|Rush
|1976
|Prog
|Rush '2112'
|Dec 31, 2011
|
|
|-
</onlyinclude>
|}

 References 

 External links 
 Official Rock Band series song list - Additional information for all songs featured in the Rock Band'' series.

Rock Band 2011
Downloadable 2011
2011 in video gaming